Live at the 9:30 is a live DVD by the band Clutch. Disc 1 is a concert DVD of the band performing their self-titled album in its entirety at the 9:30 Club in Washington, DC. Disc 2, Fortune Tellers Make a Killing Nowadays, is a road movie that takes you on the road with Clutch. "Ride along from city to city as one of the hardest working bands does what it does best. Hear from the band, crew, fans and other contemporaries along the way."

Behind the scenes footage features appearances by: Bob Balch of Fu Manchu, Robot Lords of Tokyo, General Tso, Lionize, Shavo Odadjian of System of a Down, Duff Goldman, and J. Robbins.

Personnel
Neil Fallon – Vocal and Guitar
Tim Sult – Guitars
Jean-Paul Gaster – Drums and Percussion
Dan Maines – Bass
Agent Ogden - Director / Producer
Will Duderstadt - Producer

References 

Clutch (band) video albums
2010 video albums